CGSB is an abbreviation which may refer to a number of different things:
Chatham Grammar School for Boys
 Simón Bolívar Guerrilla Coordinating Board
Canadian General Standards Board